Drivetrain may refer to:
 Drivetrain, the group of components in a motor vehicle that deliver power to the driving wheels. This excludes the engine or motor that generates the power.
 Bicycle drivetrain systems, used to transmit power on bicycles or other human-powered vehicles from the rider to the drive wheels
 Drivetrain Systems International, an Australian drivetrain constructor
 Drivetrain (album), a 2004 album by 38 Special